Alata  is a rural commune in the cercle of Tidermène in Ménaka Region of southeastern Mali. The administrative centre (chef-lieu) is at Tedjerit. The commune was created in 2001 by dividing the large rural commune of Tidermène. The implementation of Ménaka Region in 2016 led to the promotion of Tidermène to a cercle, and Alata was reincorporated into it.  the mayor is Frataye Ag Etaw.

References

External links
.

Communes of Ménaka Region